Now or Never is the fourth studio album by American R&B singer-songwriter Tank. It was released on December 14, 2010 via Atlantic Records following his departure from longtime label Blackground Records.

Background
The album was originally to be released in Fall 2009, but wasn't due to Tank leaving Blackground Records in September 2009. Since late 2008, many songs have leaked that many believed were to be on the new album, but most, if not all, of the songs are unlikely to make the final track list. In June 2010, Tank signed a new deal with Atlantic Records and aggressively began to work on the album. June 29, 2010 saw the release of the album's first single, Sex Music. The original title for the album was Sex Love & Pain II: The All Night Experience (which would be released six years later), then was changed to simply All Night before finally settling on Now or Never The original release date of the album was to be September 21, 2010, then was pushed to November 2, 2010 and now the final release date is December 14, 2010. The album is set to feature guest artists such as Drake & Chris Brown. Production is to come from the likes of Jim Jonsin, The Stereotypes, Brandon Alexander, Rico Love, Harvey Mason, Jr., plus Tank and his production team, Song Dynasty. "It's a happier album, I'm appreciating more, I'm celebrating more," he admits in an interview with TheBoomBox.com. "The sexual experiences on the album are deep but they're not dark. It's a great moment on the album where I think everyone can ride and have a smile on their face."

Singles
The album's first single, Sex Music, was released on June 8, 2010. It debuted at number 74 on Billboard's Hot R&B/Hip-Hop Songs chart. The video for "Sex Music" premiered on Vibe.com on August 5, 2010. The second single, "Emergency", was released on October 5, 2010.

Critical reception

Andy Kellman of AllMusic rated Now or Never two and a half out of five stars. He wrote that "for most of this disc's duration, Tank sticks to his solo-artist strength, providing a steady stream of low-key songs for the bedroom. Most of it simmers. The remainder boils. It’s not bound to make him much more popular, but those who dig beneath the surface of mainstream R&B will be rewarded."

Chart performance
The album debuted at number thirty five on the US Billboard 200 chart, with first-week sales of 44,000 copies. Since then, the album has sold a total of 215,000 copies in the United States.

Track listing

Charts

Weekly charts

Year-end charts

Release history

References

2010 albums
Tank (American singer) albums
Atlantic Records albums
Albums produced by Jim Jonsin
Albums produced by Rico Love